The Skyrider Sonic is a German ultralight trike, designed and produced by Skyrider Flugschule. The aircraft is supplied as a complete ready-to-fly-aircraft.

Design and development
It features a strut-braced hang glider-style high-wing, weight-shift controls, a two-seats-in-tandem open cockpit, tricycle landing gear and a single engine in pusher configuration.

The aircraft is made from square welded stainless steel tubing, with its double surface wing covered in Dacron sailcloth. Its  span Hazard 12 wing is supported by struts and uses an "A" frame weight-shift control bar. The powerplant is a four stroke turbocharged  Smart Car automotive conversion engine or, optionally, a twin cylinder, liquid-cooled, two-stroke, dual-ignition  Rotax 582 aircraft engine.

The Sonic's trike structure is also incorporated in the Ramphos Trident amphibious trike.

Specifications (Sonic)

References

External links

Photo of the Skyrider Sonic

2000s German sport aircraft
2000s German ultralight aircraft
Single-engined pusher aircraft
Ultralight trikes